John M. Walsh (born March 14, 1940) was an American politician in the state of Iowa.

Walsh was born in Lancaster, Wisconsin. He attended St. Andrew's High School there and Loras College, and was a department store manager. He served in the Iowa State Senate from 1967 to 1973 as a Republican.

References

1940 births
Living people
People from Lancaster, Wisconsin
Loras College alumni
Businesspeople from Iowa
Republican Party Iowa state senators
People from Dubuque County, Iowa